Dicerca tenebrosa, the flatheaded conifer borer, is a species of metallic wood-boring beetle in the family Buprestidae. It is found in North America.

Subspecies
These two subspecies belong to the species Dicerca tenebrosa:
 Dicerca tenebrosa knulli Nelson, 1975
 Dicerca tenebrosa tenebrosa (Kirby, 1837)

References

Further reading

External links
 

Buprestidae
Beetles of North America
Beetles described in 1837
Taxa named by William Kirby (entomologist)
Articles created by Qbugbot